Rautavesi may refer to:

 Rautavesi (Hartola), a lake in Finland
 Rautavesi (Sastamala), a lake in Finland